Discovery or Discoverie was a small 20-ton,  long "fly-boat" of the British East India Company, launched before 1602. The journey resulted in the founding of Jamestown in the new Colony of Virginia.

History
In 1602, George Weymouth became the first European to explore what would later be called Hudson Strait when he sailed Discovery  into the strait. Weymouth's expedition to find the Northwest Passage was funded jointly by the East India Company and the Muscovy Company.

Discovery, captained by John Ratcliffe, was the smallest of three ships that were led by Captain Christopher Newport on the voyage that resulted in the founding of Jamestown in the new Colony of Virginia in 1607. According to a 17th-century source, a total of 21 passengers were aboard during its initial expedition. When Captain Newport returned to London, England, he left Discovery behind for the use of the colonists.

In the summer of 1608, in the months between the first and second supply missions, Captain John Smith left Jamestown on the ship to explore the Chesapeake Bay region and search for badly needed food, covering an estimated , producing a map that was of great value to explorers for more than a century. These explorations were commemorated in the Captain John Smith Chesapeake National Historic Trail, established in 2006.

In 1610, Admiral Sir George Somers (of  fame), proposed a trip to Bermuda aboard Patience accompanied by Captain Samuel Argall on Discovery with the intention of gathering more local supplies for Jamestown. Blown north towards Newfoundland, the ships became separated in fog. Argall attempted fishing before turning back.

She then took part in six expeditions in search of the Northwest Passage. During the 1610–1611 expedition in the Canadian Arctic, the crew of Discovery mutinied, and set their captain Henry Hudson adrift in a small boat; he was not seen again, and the crew returned to England.

Replicas
A new Discovery, built in Boothbay Harbor, Maine, was launched in September 2006.

The previous replica, built in 1984 in Jamestown, was shipped to the United Kingdom for a tour of the UK as part of the celebrations of the 400th anniversary of Virginia's founding. After its tour, which finished in September 2007, the ship was laid up in Ipswich Marina awaiting a move to a more permanent home. On 19 December 2008, 402 years to the day she left London Docks bound for Virginia, she was officially handed to Westenhanger Castle in Kent by the Jamestown UK Foundation, who had brought the replica vessel to the UK. The ship is currently on permanent display at the castle.

Modern depictions

In May 2007, the United States Postal Service issued the first 41 cent denomination first class stamp. The stamp had an image of Susan Constant, Godspeed, and Discovery.

Discovery was also depicted on Virginia's coin of the 50 State Quarters, in celebration of the quadricentennial of Jamestown.

See also
 Ship replica (including a list of ship replicas)

References

Works cited

External links
 Discovery replica at Museum in Docklands, London
 Jamestown settlement ships

Exploration ships of England
English colonization of the Americas
History of the Thirteen Colonies
Replica ships